Margot Fassler is an American music and Christianity historian, currently the Keough-Hesburgh Professor Professor of Music History and Liturgy at University of Notre Dame.

References

Year of birth missing (living people)
Living people
University of Notre Dame faculty
American music historians
American theologians
Syracuse University alumni
Cornell University alumni
Fellows of the Medieval Academy of America